Tim Kirkman is an American screenwriter and director. 

Kirkman's feature film debut, Dear Jesse, was released theatrically by Cowboy Pictures in 1998. A documentary film about the political and personal parallels between the gay filmmaker and the notoriously anti-gay U.S. Senator Jesse Helms, Dear Jesse, made its cable television debut on HBO/Cinemax's Reel Life series and was nominated for an Emmy Award in the News/Documentary Writing category in 2000. The TV broadcast version of the film featured an interview with Matthew Shepard, a college student whose murder called attention to gay-bashing and hate crimes.

His second film, the performance documentary The Night Larry Kramer Kissed Me, David Drake's solo off-Broadway hit play about writer Larry Kramer, was released by FilmNext in 2000. He also directed 2nd Serve, written by James Markert and starring Josh Hopkins, Cameron Monaghan, Alexie Gilmore, Sam McMurray, Guillermo Diaz, Kevin Sussman and Dash Mihok.

Kirkman's narrative feature debut, Loggerheads, which he wrote and directed, premiered at the 2005 Sundance Film Festival where it was nominated for the Grand Jury Prize for Best Dramatic Feature and won prizes at several film festivals across the United States, including the Grand Jury Prize at Outfest. The film, which stars Tess Harper, Bonnie Hunt, Michael Kelly, Michael Learned, Kip Pardue, Chris Sarandon and Robin Weigert, was released by Strand Releasing in October 2005.

Kirkman most recent film, Lazy Eye, which he wrote, directed, and produced (with Todd Shotz) was released in 2016 and starts Lucas Near-Verbrugghe, Aaron Costa Ganis and Michaela Watkins.

Filmography

Dear Jesse (1998) - Writer/director (documentary)
The Night Larry Kramer Kissed Me (2000) - Director
Loggerheads (2005) - Writer/director
2nd Serve (2013) - Director
Lazy Eye (2016) - Writer/director

References

External links

1966 births
American male screenwriters
Living people
American film directors